Thomas Jean Roger Levet (born 5 September 1968) is a French professional golfer who is a member of the European Tour and former member of the PGA Tour.

Career
Levet was born in Paris, France. He turned professional in 1988 and won the French PGA Championship that year, but he had to wait for a decade for his first win on the European Tour, which came at the 1998 Cannes Open.

In 2002, he finished second at The Open Championship at Muirfield, being one of four players in a playoff. He had a good chance to win, but bogeyed the final hole of the four-hole playoff to fall into sudden death with Ernie Els, where he again bogeyed to lose to Els.

After spending 2003 on the PGA Tour, he returned to the European Tour in 2004. He claimed the most prestigious title of his career at the Scottish Open, and was a member of the winning 2004 European Ryder Cup Team. Levet ended the season 5th on the Order of Merit, and returned to the PGA Tour in 2005.

Levet suffers from severe vertigo, which almost forced him out of the game, however he has made strides to overcome the condition, and has featured in the top 50 of the Official World Golf Rankings.

In 2008 he won his fourth European Tour title, beating nineteen-year-old Oliver Fisher in a sudden death playoff in the MAPFRE Open de Andalucia.

His fifth win on the European Tour came at the 2009 Open de España where he held off a charging Fabrizio Zanotti, who shot a final round 65, by two strokes finishing 18 under par. With this win Levet became the leading Frenchman in terms of European Tour wins.

Levet won his sixth European Tour title in July 2011 when he triumphed in his native country, at the Alstom Open de France by one stroke from Englishman Mark Foster and Dane Thorbjørn Olesen. He became the 7th French player to win the tournament after Jean-François Remésy. While celebrating his victory, Levet jumped into a lake, breaking his shin, and causing him to withdraw from The Open Championship.

Professional wins (15)

European Tour wins (6)

European Tour playoff record (2–2)

Other wins (6)
1988 French PGA Championship
1990 National Omnium (France)
1991 French PGA Championship
1992 Championnat de France Pro
1997 Toulouse Open, New Caledonia French Masters

European Senior Tour wins (3)

European Senior Tour playoff record (1–0)

Playoff record
PGA Tour playoff record (0–1)

Results in major championships

CUT = missed the half-way cut
"T" = tied

Summary

Most consecutive cuts made – 5 (1999 Open Championship – 2002 PGA)
Longest streak of top-10s – 1 (twice)

Results in The Players Championship

CUT = missed the halfway cut

Results in World Golf Championships

QF, R16, R32, R64 = Round in which player lost in match play
"T" = Tied
Note that the HSBC Champions did not become a WGC event until 2009.

Team appearances
Amateur
European Boys' Team Championship (representing France): 1985
Jacques Léglise Trophy (representing the Continent of Europe): 1985
European Amateur Team Championship (representing France): 1987
Eisenhower Trophy (representing France): 1988

Professional
Alfred Dunhill Cup (representing France): 1992, 1998, 2000
World Cup (representing France): 1998, 2000, 2001, 2002, 2003, 2004, 2005, 2009
Seve Trophy (representing Continental Europe): 2002, 2005
Ryder Cup (representing Europe): 2004 (winners)

See also
1993 PGA Tour Qualifying School graduates

References

External links

French male golfers
European Tour golfers
PGA Tour golfers
European Senior Tour golfers
Ryder Cup competitors for Europe
Golfers from Paris
People from Palm Beach Gardens, Florida
1968 births
Living people